Symphony No. 1 in D minor may refer to

 Symphony No. 1 The Gothic by Havergal Brian
 Symphony No. 1 by Charles Ives
 Symphony No. 1 by Giuseppe Martucci
 Symphony No. 1 by Sergei Rachmaninoff
 Symphony No. 1 for organ by Louis Vierne
 Symphony No. 1 by Alexander von Zemlinsky

See also 
 Symphony No. 1 (disambiguation)